Huffman is an unincorporated community in Harrison Township, Spencer County, in the U.S. state of Indiana.

History
An old variant name of the community was Huffmans Mills. The town's proprietor, John R. Huffman operated a gristmill and sawmill and kept a store. A post office was established at Huffman in 1882, and remained in operation until it was discontinued in 1935.

Geography

References

Unincorporated communities in Spencer County, Indiana
Unincorporated communities in Indiana